Dirty Love may refer to:

Films
Dirty Love (film), a 2005 film
Dirty Love, a 1988 Italian film; see Jeff Stryker

Music
"Dirty Love", a song by Cher Lloyd from the 2014 album Sorry I'm Late
"Dirty Love" (song), a 2014 song by Wilkinson
"Dirty Love", a song by Frank Zappa from the 1973 album Over-Nite Sensation
"Dirty Love", a song by Kesha, featuring Iggy Pop, from the 2012 album Warrior
"Dirty Love", a song by Motörhead on the B-Side of the "Ace of Spades" single

See also
Sexual intercourse